American Motors Incorporated (AMI) designed, manufactured, and sold a minivan for commercial delivery use in the late 1940s.

History
American Motors Incorporated was established around 1946. It was very short-lived; it does not seem to have been in operation after 1949. It had executive offices on Park Avenue in New York City, and a factory and service facility located upstate in Troy, New York.

Lack of success
Small delivery vehicles such as the Delcar did not succeed. Purchasers were limited by their carrying capacity. A larger truck can haul more cargo, resulting in less cost per mile traveled. Few niche market customers demand such a specialized service vehicle.

Products
The company manufactured a minivan designed for business delivery uses called the Delcar. The wheelbase was only  with a  engine, and it was priced at US$890. The Delcar was the first American vehicle with independent suspension on all four wheels, though the suspension used airplane landing gear-like rubber tension cords.

One or more station wagons were produced using the same chassis, as well as the Delcar van. The station wagon could seat six passengers.

References

Further reading
 Original Delcar retail sales brochure (four pages) printed by AMI - see images
 Mechanix Illustrated, August 1949 — brief article and picture depicting the Delcar
 Special Interest Auto magazine (Hemmings Motor News), October 1978 — brief article about the Delcar

Defunct motor vehicle manufacturers of the United States
Vehicle manufacturing companies established in 1946
Vehicle manufacturing companies disestablished in 1948
1946 establishments in New York (state)
1948 disestablishments in New York (state)
Motor vehicle manufacturers based in New York (state)